John Woodcock O.F.M. (1603–1646) was a Franciscan priest from Lancashire executed in August 1646 under the 1585 "Act against Jesuits, Seminary priests and other such like disobedient persons" (27 Eliz. c. 2) for being a priest and present in the realm.

Life
John Woodcock was born at Woodcock Hall in Leyland, Lancashire, in England. His parents, Thomas and Dorothy Anderton Woodcock, were of the middle class. His father conformed to protect the family estate, while his mother remained Catholic.

Woodcock converted to Catholicism about 1623, which displeased his father to the extent that John went to live with his maternal grandfather at Clayton. Eventually, under the care of Edward Squire SJ, he and others crossed over to Belgium. He studied at Saint-Omer, and after completing the humanities was sent to the English College, Rome, for further theological studies.

An attempt to join the Order of Friars Minor Capuchin in Paris was interrupted by poor health and he wandered around Europe for a time before approaching the English Franciscans at Douai. He received the habit from Henry Heath in 1631, and was given the name Martin of St. Felix, and was professed by Arthur Bell a year later. For some years he lived at Arras as chaplain to a Mr. Sheldon. He served in England briefly in 1635 but was sent back to France because of ill health. He was sent to Spa, Belgium to recuperate.

Upon learning of the execution in April 1643 of Henry Heath, who had received him into the order, Woodcock applied for permission to return to England. Late in 1643 he landed at Newcastle-on-Tyne, and was arrested on the first night he spent in Lancashire. After two years' imprisonment in Lancaster Castle, he was condemned on 6 August 1646, on his own confession, for being a priest, together with two others, Edward Bamber and Thomas Whittaker.

On 7 August 1646, in an attempted execution, he was flung off a ladder, but the rope broke. He was then hanged a second time, was cut down and disemboweled alive. The Franciscan Sisters at Taunton possess an arm-bone of the martyr.

Woodcock sometimes went by the alias "Farington".

John Woodcock was among the eighty-five martyrs of England and Wales beatified by Pope John Paul II on 22 November 1987.

References

1603 births
1646 deaths
People from Leyland, Lancashire
Converts to Roman Catholicism
17th-century English Roman Catholic priests
17th-century Roman Catholic martyrs
Executed people from Lancashire
Eighty-five martyrs of England and Wales
Capuchins
English Franciscans